Arenite Ridge is a steep-sided rock and snow ridge in northern Alexander Island, extending  in a north–south direction lying immediately west of the Douglas Range and forming the eastern wall of Toynbee Glacier. The ridge includes Mount Tyrrell (which has two summits) and Mount Tilley. It was named by the UK Antarctic Place-Names Committee in 1977 from the sandstone-type rocks (arenite) that form this feature.

References 

Ridges of Alexander Island